Bollinger Peak is a  mountain summit located on the shared border of Sublette County and Fremont County in the state of Wyoming, United States.

Description 
The peak is situated in the remote Wind River Range, on the Continental Divide, in the renowned Cirque of the Towers. It is set on the common boundary Popo Agie Wilderness shares with the Bridger Wilderness, on land managed by Bridger-Teton National Forest and Shoshone National Forest. Nearby geographic features include Wolfs Head, 0.16 mile to the south, Sharks Nose one-half mile south, and Pingora Peak 0.44 miles to the southeast. The peak's unofficial name commemorates Karl Bollinger who perished August 11, 1953, from a leader fall on nearby War Bonnet Peak, the day after he climbed this namesake peak. His name has also been reported as Karl Bollinger Jr., and Kent Bollinger.

Climbing 

The northeast ridge was first climbed in 1941 by Norman Clyde, Edith and J. Holliday, and B. Pitcher. Other established routes include the West Face by Steven French and Matt Parramore in 1981, and the West Pillar (IV 5.10).

Climate 
According to the Köppen climate classification system, Bollinger Peak is located in an alpine subarctic climate zone with long, cold, snowy winters, and cool to warm summers. Due to its altitude, it receives precipitation all year, as snow in winter, and as thunderstorms in summer. Precipitation runoff from the mountain's west side drains to the Green River via Washakie Creek, and the east side drains into Lonesome Lake, thence North Fork Popo Agie River.

Hazards

Encountering bears is a concern in the Wind River Range. There are other concerns as well, including bugs, wildfires, adverse snow conditions and nighttime cold temperatures.

Importantly, there have been notable incidents, including accidental deaths, due to falls from steep cliffs (a misstep could be fatal in this class 4/5 terrain) and due to falling rocks, over the years, including 1993, 2007 (involving an experienced NOLS leader), 2015 and 2018. A 54-year-old climber fell 400–800 feet to his death from Steeple Peak in 2017. Other incidents include a seriously injured backpacker being airlifted near Squaretop Mountain in 2005, and a fatal hiker incident (from an apparent accidental fall) in 2006 that involved state search and rescue. The U.S. Forest Service does not offer updated aggregated records on the official number of fatalities in the Wind River Range.

See also
 List of mountain peaks of Wyoming

References

External links 
 Bollinger Peak rock climbing: Mountainproject.com
 Bollinger's fatality report: AAC-publications

Bridger–Teton National Forest
Shoshone National Forest
Mountains of Sublette County, Wyoming
Mountains of Fremont County, Wyoming
Mountains of Wyoming
North American 3000 m summits
Rocky Mountains